Almost Famous is a 2000 American comedy-drama film written and directed by Cameron Crowe, and starring Billy Crudup, Frances McDormand, Kate Hudson, and Patrick Fugit. It tells the story of a teenage journalist, played by Fugit, writing for Rolling Stone magazine in the early 1970s, touring with the fictitious rock band Stillwater, and writing his first cover story on the band. The film is semi-autobiographical, as Crowe himself was a teenage writer for Rolling Stone.

The film was a box office bomb, grossing $47.4 million against a $60 million budget. Despite this, it received widespread acclaim from critics and received four Academy Award nominations, including a win for Best Original Screenplay. It was also awarded the 2001 Grammy Award for Best Compilation Soundtrack Album for a Motion Picture, Television or Other Visual Media. Roger Ebert hailed it the best film of the year as well as the ninth-best film of the 2000s. It also won two Golden Globe Awards, for Best Motion Picture – Musical or Comedy and Best Supporting Actress – Motion Picture (Hudson). It has since become a cult classic and in a 2016 international poll conducted by BBC, Almost Famous was ranked the 79th greatest film since 2000. In a Hollywood Reporter 2014 list voted on by "studio chiefs, Oscar winners and TV royalty", Almost Famous was ranked the 71st greatest film of all time. A stage musical adaptation of the film opened on Broadway in November 2022.

Plot

In San Diego 1969, child prodigy William Miller struggles to fit in. His life is further complicated after learning that his widowed college-professor mother Elaine has falsely led him to believe he is twelve years old. William is actually eleven, having started the first grade at five years old, and skipping fifth grade. Strong-willed Elaine's strict ban on rock music and her fear of pop culture have a negative effect on her children, finally driving William's 18-year-old sister Anita to move to San Francisco and become a flight attendant.

In 1973, William, now fifteen, influenced by Anita's secret cache of rock albums, aspires to be a rock journalist, writing freelance articles for underground papers in San Diego. Rock journalist Lester Bangs, impressed with William's writing, gives him a $35 assignment to review a Black Sabbath concert. William is barred from backstage until the opening band Stillwater arrives and William flatters his way in. Lead guitarist Russell Hammond takes a liking to him and his new acquaintance, veteran groupie Penny Lane, who has taken him under her wing. Despite behaving as stereotypical groupies, Penny Lane insists she and her friends are "band aids", a term she invented to describe female fans that are there more for the music than for the rock stars themselves.

Rolling Stone editor Ben Fong-Torres hires William to write an article about Stillwater, based on his skills, and sends him on the road with the band. William interviews the other band members, but Russell repeatedly puts him off. Tensions between Russell and lead singer Jeff Bebe soon become evident and not helped at all by the band's first t-shirt, a full band shot that pictures Russell in full view while the rest of the band is in the shadows. William is jokingly called "the enemy" by the band as he is a journalist, but he gradually begins to lose his objectivity as he becomes integrated into their inner circle.

The record label hires Dennis, a professional manager, to handle problems with venues and promoters. Penny has to leave before the band reaches New York, where Russell's girlfriend Leslie will join them. Penny and her three protégée band aids are gambled away to another band in a poker game; Penny acts nonchalantly but is devastated. Meanwhile, Dennis charters a small plane so the band can play more gigs.

Penny shows up uninvited at the New York restaurant where they are celebrating the news that they are to be featured on the cover of Rolling Stone. Penny is asked to leave after her attempts to get Russell's attention are noticed. William chases her to her hotel, where he saves her from overdosing on quaaludes.

Flying to a gig the following day, the plane encounters severe weather. Fearing the plane will crash, everyone confesses their secrets, while Jeff and Russell's long-simmering conflicts erupt. William confesses his love for Penny after Jeff insults her. The plane lands safely in Tupelo, leaving everyone to ponder the changed atmosphere.

William arrives at the Rolling Stone office in San Francisco but has difficulty finishing the article. Seeking help, he calls Lester Bangs who says William got caught up in being part of the band. He says his perceived friendships with them are not real and advises him to "be honest...and unmerciful." Rolling Stones editors rave over William's completed article, but when the magazine's fact checker calls the band, Russell lies to protect Stillwater's image, claiming most of it is false. Rolling Stone kills the article, crushing William. Anita encounters a dejected William in the airport and offers to take him anywhere; he chooses for them to go to their home in San Diego, where their mother Elaine is glad to see them both.

Sapphire, one of the protégée "Band Aids", chastises Russell for betraying William. He then calls Penny, wanting to meet with her, but she gives him William's address. He arrives and finds himself face-to-face with William's mother who, during the tour, scolded him over the phone for his behavior. He apologizes to William and finally gives him an interview. Russell has verified the article to Rolling Stone, which runs it as a cover feature. Penny fulfills her long-standing fantasy to go to Morocco while Stillwater tours again by bus.

Cast

Production
Crowe used a composite of the bands he had known to create Stillwater, the emerging group that welcomes the young journalist into its sphere, then becomes wary of his intentions. "Stillwater" was the name of a real band signed to Macon, Georgia's Capricorn Records label, which required the film's producers to obtain permission to use the name. In an interview, real Stillwater guitarist Bobby Golden said, "They could have probably done it without permission but they probably would have had a bunch of different lawsuits. Our lawyer got in touch with them. They wanted us to do it for free and I said, 'No we're not doing it for free.' So we got a little bit of change out of it." Seventies rocker Peter Frampton served as a technical consultant on the film. Crowe and his then-wife, musician Nancy Wilson of Heart, co-wrote three of the five Stillwater songs in the film, and Frampton wrote the other two, with Mike McCready of Pearl Jam playing lead guitar on all of the Stillwater songs.

Patrick Fugit, "a complete unknown from Salt Lake City, Utah," was cast late in the process after Crowe and casting director Gail Levin watched Fugit's self-taped audition.

The character of Russell Hammond was originally set to be played by Brad Pitt. But during rehearsal prior to filming, Crowe and Pitt mutually decided that it was "not the right fit", and Pitt dropped out of the project. The line "I am a golden god!" in the pool-jumping sequence, as well as numerous references to Russell Hammond being unusually good looking, were written for Pitt, but remained in the script after Billy Crudup was cast. In a 2020 interview with The New York Times, Crowe confirmed that the "golden god" scene was inspired by Led Zeppelin lead singer Robert Plant, who had uttered the quote on a "Riot House" balcony.

Jack Black and Jon Favreau auditioned for the role of Lester Bangs.

Crowe based the character of Penny Lane on the real-life Pennie Lane Trumbull and her group of female promoters who called themselves the "Flying Garter Girls Group". Though they were not in the Flying Garter Girls group, various other women have been described as Crowe's inspiration, for instance Pamela Des Barres and Bebe Buell. Sarah Polley was originally cast as Penny Lane, but, when Brad Pitt dropped out, she dropped out as well and was replaced with Kate Hudson. Natalie Portman was also considered.

The character of William Miller's mother (played by Frances McDormand) was based on Crowe's own mother, who even showed up on the set to keep an eye on him while he worked. Although he asked his mother not to bother McDormand, the two women ended up getting along well. Meryl Streep was also considered for the role.

Alice in Chains' guitarist/vocalist Jerry Cantrell was Crowe's first choice for the role of Stillwater bass player Larry Fellows. Cantrell is friends with Crowe and had previously appeared in two films directed by him, Singles (1992) and Jerry Maguire (1996). Cantrell was busy writing the songs for his solo album Degradation Trip and had to turn the role down. Mark Kozelek was cast instead.

Crowe took a copy of the film to London for a special screening with Led Zeppelin members Jimmy Page and Plant. After the screening, Led Zeppelin granted Crowe the right to use one of their songs on the soundtrack—the first time they had ever consented to this since allowing Crowe to use "Kashmir" in Fast Times at Ridgemont High (1982)—and also gave him rights to four of their other songs in the movie itself, although they did not grant him the rights to "Stairway to Heaven" for an intended scene (on the special "Bootleg" edition DVD, the scene is included as an extra, sans the song, where the viewer is instructed by a watermark to begin playing it).

In his 2012 memoir My Cross to Bear, Gregg Allman writes that several aspects of the movie are based on Crowe's time spent with the Allman Brothers Band. The scene in which Russell jumps from the top of the Topeka party house into a pool was based on something Duane Allman did: "the jumping off the roof into the pool, that was Duane—from the third floor of a place called the Travelodge in San Francisco. My brother wanted to do it again, but the cat who owned the place came out shaking his fist, yelling at him. We told that story all the time, and I have no doubt that Cameron was around for it." He also confirms that he and Dickey Betts played a joke on Crowe by claiming clauses in their contract did not allow his story to be published—just before he was to deliver it to Rolling Stone.

The airplane malfunction "near Tupelo, Mississippi" that occurred in the film is a thinly veiled reference to the Lynyrd Skynyrd airplane crash on October 20, 1977.

Filming of the movie lasted 92 days.

Soundtrack

The Almost Famous soundtrack album was awarded the 2001 Grammy Award for Best Compilation Soundtrack Album for a Motion Picture, Television or Other Visual Media.

Personnel

"Stillwater"
 Jason Lee ("Jeff Bebe") - vocals
 Billy Crudup ("Russell Hammond") - guitar
 Mark Kozelek ("Larry Fellows") - bass guitar
 John Fedevich ("Ed Vallencourt") - drums

Other personnel
 Nancy Wilson
 Peter Frampton
 Mike McCready
 Jon Bayless
 Ben Smith
 Gordon Kennedy
 Marti Frederiksen – vocals

Songs on the Soundtrack 
 Simon & Garfunkel: America - 3:37
 The Who: Sparks - 3:48
 Todd Rundgren: It Wouldn't Have Made Any Difference - 3:51
 Yes: Your Move - 3:33
 The Beach Boys: Feel Flows - 4:43
 Stillwater: Fever Dog - 3:09
 Rod Stewart: Every Picture Tells A Story - 5:54
 The Seeds: Mr Farmer - 2:51
 The Allman Brothers Band: One Way Out - 4:58
 Lynyrd Skynyrd: Simple Man - 5:56
 Led Zeppelin: That's The Way - 5:36
 Elton John: Tiny Dancer - 6:14
 Nancy Wilson: Lucky Trumble - 2:41
 The Velvet Underground: I'm Waiting for The Man - 4:39
 Cat Stevens: The Wind - 1:40
 Clarence Carter: Slip Away - 2:31
 Thunderclap Newman: Something In The Air - 3:53

Reception

Box office
Almost Famous had its premiere at the 2000 Toronto International Film Festival. It was subsequently given a limited release on September 15, 2000, in 131 theaters where it grossed $2.3 million on its first weekend. It was given a wider release on September 22, 2000, in 1,193 theaters where it grossed $6.9 million on its opening weekend. The film went on to make $31.7 million in North America and $14.8 million in the rest of the world for a worldwide total of $47.4 million against a $60 million budget.

Critical response
Almost Famous received widespread critical acclaim. On Rotten Tomatoes, it holds an 89% approval rating, based on 175 reviews, with an average rating of 7.90/10. The site's critical consensus reads, "Almost Famous, with its great ensemble performances and story, is a well-crafted, warm-hearted movie that successfully draws you into its era." On Metacritic it has a score of 90 out of 100, based on 38 reviews, indicating "universal acclaim." Audiences polled by CinemaScore gave the film an average grade of "A−" on an A+ to F scale.

Film critic Roger Ebert gave the film four out of four stars, naming it the best film of 2000, and described it as "funny and touching in so many different ways." In his review for The New York Times, A.O. Scott wrote, "The movie's real pleasures are to be found not in its story but in its profusion of funny, offbeat scenes. It's the kind of picture that invites you to go back and savor your favorite moments like choice album cuts." Richard Corliss of Time praised the film's screenplay for "giving each character his reasons, making everyone in the emotional debate charming and compelling, creating fictional people who breathe in a story with an organic life." In her review for the L.A. Weekly, Manohla Dargis wrote that "the film shimmers with the irresistible pleasures that define Hollywood at its best—it's polished like glass, funny, knowing and bright, and filled with characters whose lives are invariably sexier and more purposeful than our own." Peter Travers of Rolling Stone wrote, "Not since A Hard Day's Night has a movie caught the thrumming exuberance of going where the music takes you." In his review for Newsweek, David Ansen wrote, "Character-driven, it relies on chemistry, camaraderie, a sharp eye for detail and good casting." Entertainment Weekly put it on its end-of-the-decade, "best-of" list, saying, "Every Cameron Crowe film is, in one way or another, about romance, rock & roll, and his romance with rock & roll. This power ballad of a movie, from 2000, also happens to be Crowe's greatest (and most personal) film thanks to the golden gods of Stillwater and their biggest fan, Kate Hudson's incomparable Penny Lane."

Entertainment Weekly gave the film an "A−" rating and Owen Gleiberman praised Crowe for depicting the 1970s as "an era that found its purpose in having no purpose. Crowe, staying close to his memories, has gotten it, for perhaps the first time, onto the screen." In his review for the Los Angeles Times, Kenneth Turan praised Philip Seymour Hoffman's portrayal of Lester Bangs: "Superbly played by Philip Seymour Hoffman, more and more the most gifted and inspired character actor working in film, what could have been the clichéd portrait of an older mentor who speaks the straight truth blossoms into a marvelous personality." However, in his review for The New York Observer, Andrew Sarris felt that "none of the non-musical components on the screen matched the excitement of the music. For whatever reason, too much of the dark side has been left out." Desson Howe, in his review for The Washington Post, found it "very hard to see these long-haired kids as products of the 1970s instead of dressed up actors from the Seattle-Starbucks era. I couldn't help wondering how many of these performers had to buy a CD copy of the song and study it for the first time."

Versions
In addition to the original "Theatrical" version, the film's DVD and Blu-Ray releases include a version known as the "Extended," "Bootleg," or "Untitled" version. This Extended version has about 40 minutes of additional footage.

Accolades

Stage musical adaptation 

In 2018, Crowe said he was working on a stage musical adaptation of the film, in which he would pen the stage libretto and write the musical numbers with Tom Kitt. It premiered in San Diego at The Old Globe in 2019 and creative work continued during the COVID-19 pandemic. In June 2022, the musical announced that it will transfer to Broadway, with previews beginning September 13 and opening night scheduled for October 11, 2022. The cast of the production, directed by Jeremy Herrin, will include newcomer Casey Likes (in his Broadway acting debut) as William Miller, Chris Wood as Russell Hammond, Anika Larsen as Elaine Miller, Solea Pfeiffer as Penny Lane, Drew Gehling as Jeff Bebe, Emily Schultheis as Anita Miller, Jana Djenne Jackson as Polexia Aphrodisia, Katie Ladner as Sapphire, Gerard Canonico as Dick Roswell and Rob Colletti as Lester Bangs.

See also

 List of media set in San Diego

References

External links

 
 
 
 
 
 
 

2000 films
2000 comedy-drama films
2000s coming-of-age comedy-drama films
2000s English-language films
2000s musical comedy-drama films
2000s road comedy-drama films
American coming-of-age comedy-drama films
American musical comedy-drama films
American road comedy-drama films
American rock music films
BAFTA winners (films)
Best Musical or Comedy Picture Golden Globe winners
Columbia Pictures films
DreamWorks Pictures films
Films about groupies
Films about journalists
Films about musical groups
Films directed by Cameron Crowe
Films featuring a Best Supporting Actress Golden Globe-winning performance
Films produced by Ian Bryce
Films produced by Cameron Crowe
Films set in the 1970s
Films set in Cleveland
Films set in Kansas
Films set in Mississippi
Films set in San Diego
Films set in San Francisco
Films whose writer won the Best Original Screenplay Academy Award
Films whose writer won the Best Original Screenplay BAFTA Award
Films with screenplays by Cameron Crowe
Films about mother–son relationships
Vinyl Films films
2000s American films